LaserPacific Media Corporation was a television and motion picture post-production facility operating in Hollywood, Burbank, Calif., New York, and in Vancouver, Canada. Laser-Pacific was formerly a publicly traded corporation, prior to being a subsidiary of Eastman Kodak (2003-2010), prior to being owned by HIG Capital (2010-2011), and bought by Technicolor SA in 2011.

LaserPacific provided technological solutions for motion pictures and television, including services such as online video editing, audio services, telecine, film scanning and recording, digital intermediates (DI), multimedia, DVD authoring and video compression, as well as digital cinema packaging for customers ranging from independent filmmakers to major studios. LaserPacific created a new workflow for independent film makers called inDI. The company earned six Emmy awards for outstanding achievement in engineering development.

History 

Laser Pacific Media has its roots in several companies.  The oldest, Compact Video Systems, was a remote truck operator that began in 1972. It provided the remote facilities for the 1977 location recordings of "The Nixon Interviews" when David Frost and the former President sat down for a grueling series of historic interviews. 28 hours, 45 minutes of material was recorded over a 12-day period in March 1977. The equipment Compact Video supplied included three RCA TK-44B cameras and RCA TR-70 Quadruplex recorders.  The edited programs aired in May and Sept. of 1977.

PVI opened Pacific Video Post Production Center, Ltd. in 1979 with financing through a limited partnership tax shelter for entertainers Olivia Newton-John, Karen and Richard Carpenter and others. In 1982 it was acquired by Robert Seidenglanz, the maverick entrepreneur who founded Compact Video. A company known for being "a step ahead", Robert Seidenglanz also acquired and shaped the face of Television with the instrumental company RTS Systems. a PVI competitor in the television remote truck business.  
 
Seidenglanz, several former Compact Video associates and former PVI executives operated Pacific Video as a post house focusing on filmed, network produced dramas.

Gregory L. Biller formed Spectra Image in 1983 as a post production service primarily for filmed situation comedies.  In 1985 Spectra developed a transportable computerized  random access editing system called Spectra System,  which used proprietary laser disc technology for editing filmed or videotaped programs. The system allowed editors to quickly find shots and segments without waiting for tapes to shuttle from place to place.

The Spectra Ace was introduced to the market in 1986, and won the company an Emmy Award. The proprietary system for off-line editing incorporates an edit controller,  a video switcher,  single and dual-headed laser disc players, video monitors, videotape recorders, terminal equipment and associated software.  It operated Laser Edit, Inc. as a marketing arm. Laser Edit became a post production house over time.

In 1990, Spectra Image and Pacific Video were merged into a new company, Laser Pacific, although the Pacific Video and Laser Edit corporate identities remain.

The company was acquired by Eastman Kodak in late 2003 for $30.5 million. In April 2010, Kodak sold Laser Pacific and its subsidiaries Laser-Edit, Inc, and Pacific Video, Inc. for an undisclosed sum to HIG Capital. In 2011, Technicolor SA acquired the company, changing the name of the facility to Technicolor.

Awards

Emmy awards 

 2003: Engineering Emmy Award: LaserPacific Media Corporation for the 24P HDTV Post-Production System
 2001: Engineering Emmy Award: LaserPacific for significant contributions to the creation of the 24P High Definition technology that has become standard throughout the industry.
 1996: Engineering Emmy Award: LaserPacific Media Corporation for the Supercomputer Assembly
 1993–94: (NATAS) Outstanding Achievement in Engineering Development -- For The Development and Implementation of Technology For The Removal of Temporal Artifacts From Film Originated 525 Material to 625.
 1989: Engineering Emmy Award: Pacific Video Inc. for the Electronic Laboratory
 1987: Engineering Emmy Award: Spectra Image, Inc. for D220 Dual Headed Video Disc Player

References

External links 
 Hollywood Post Alliance
 LaserPacific website, 2011 

Kodak
Film production companies of the United States
Companies based in California